Sir Walter Hamilton Moberly  (20 October 1881 – 31 January 1974) was a British academic, born into a clerical dynasty.

Early life

Walter Hamilton Moberly was born on 20 October 1881 in Budworth, Cheshire to Alice Sidney, née Hamilton (1851–1939) and Rev. Robert Campbell Moberly and the grandson of George Moberly. His aunt was Charlotte Anne Moberly, first Principal of St Hugh's College, Oxford. He was educated at Winchester College and New College, Oxford.

Career 
Moberly became a lecturer in political science at the University of Aberdeen from 1905 to 1906. He was a fellow of Merton College, Oxford, from 1904 to 1907. 

While Fellow and Lecturer in philosophy at Lincoln College, Oxford he contributed essays on "The Atonement" and "God and the Absolute" to the symposium Foundations: A Statement of Christian Belief in Terms of Modern Thought, published in 1912. He served in World War I with the Oxfordshire and Buckinghamshire Light Infantry, being twice mentioned in despatches and injured three times.

After the war, he was professor of philosophy at the University of Birmingham from 1921 to 1924, Principal of the University College of the South West of England from 1925 to 1926, Vice-Chancellor of the University of Manchester from 1926 to 1934, Chairman of the University Grants Committee from 1935 to 1949 and the first Principal of St Catherine's Foundation from 1949 to 1955, alongside E. Amy Buller as Warden.

Moberly was also an author, having written such books as The Crisis in the University (London: SCM Press) and The Ethics of Punishment (London: Faber, 1968 ). He was a great-uncle of the theologian R. W. L. Moberly.

Legacy

Winchester College's main library is named after him; Moberly Tower, a hall of residence at the Victoria University of Manchester was named after him. It was part of the refectory complex built in the 1960s; the tower was demolished ca. 2008.
The Walter Moberly Building is also named after him at Keele University. It was built in 1954 and originally named the Conference Hall; it was renamed the Walter Moberly Hall in May 1960. This recognised Moberly's contribution to the creation of the experimental University College of North Staffordshire (the "Keele Experiment"), which received the Royal Charter as the University of Keele in 1962. A house in the former Duryard Hall of Residence at the University of Exeter was also named after him, but has since been demolished.

Personal life 
Moberly married a former student, Gwendolen Gardner (1892–1975), on 29 December 1921. She had studied political philosophy with him at Oxford. They had four sons.

References

External links
 

1881 births
1974 deaths
People educated at Winchester College
Knights Bachelor
Oxfordshire and Buckinghamshire Light Infantry officers
Knights Commander of the Order of the Bath
Knights Grand Cross of the Order of the British Empire
Companions of the Distinguished Service Order
British Army personnel of World War I
Alumni of New College, Oxford
Academics of the University of Aberdeen
Vice-Chancellors of the Victoria University of Manchester
Academics of the University of Birmingham
Principals of the University College of the South West of England
Fellows of Merton College, Oxford